Martin Bashir is an American hour-long weekday U.S. and world political commentary program hosted by Martin Bashir. The program aired live at 4:00 p.m. ET on MSNBC. The program premiered on February 28, 2011 moving MSNBC Live with Thomas Roberts to 11:00 a.m. ET. It aired from a small customized studio that is actually part of Studio 3A, the primary MSNBC newsroom and studio at 30 Rock.

Show content
The program was often a mix of both news and opinion content, serving as a lead-in to the network's afternoon and prime time opinion programming. Bashir gave thoughts on the issues of the day along with a panel of guests and other relevant interviews pertaining to a specific issue being covered. Bashir presented the series with a liberal point of view.

Broadcast history
The program originally aired in the 3 p.m. slot, but moved forward one hour on June 25, 2012, replacing The Dylan Ratigan Show. The Cycle, a new multi-host program, launched in the 3 p.m. hour beginning the same day.

The show was effectively cancelled after its November 22 edition after controversial comments from Bashir made about the former Governor of Alaska and Vice Presidential candidate Sarah Palin the previous week, going on an already-planned Thanksgiving break.  On December 4, 2013, Bashir resigned from his position at MSNBC after he made "ill-judged comments" about Sarah Palin.

Segments
Play of the Day - A viral video is shown.
Top Lines - Various soundbites featuring things said by politicians and comedians are highlighted.
Here's the Story - Only featured during the 2012 Republican Nominee Campaign, a segment featuring discussion on the nominees.
Clear the Air - Martin gives his thoughts on a news story of the day.

References

External links
Official website
Official show Twitter account

2010s American television news shows
2011 American television series debuts
2013 American television series endings
English-language television shows
MSNBC original programming